The hilt (rarely called a haft or shaft) of a knife, dagger, sword, or bayonet is its handle, consisting of a guard, grip and pommel. The guard may contain a crossguard or quillons.  A tassel or sword knot may be attached to the guard or pommel.

Pommel 

The pommel (Anglo-Norman  "little apple") is an enlarged fitting at the top of the handle. They were originally developed to prevent the sword from slipping from the hand. From around the 11th century in Europe they became heavy enough to be a counterweight to the blade. This gave the sword a point of balance not too far from the hilt allowing a more fluid fighting style. Depending on sword design and swordsmanship style, the pommel may also be used to strike the opponent (e.g., using the Mordhau technique).

Pommels have appeared in a wide variety of shapes, including oblate spheroids, crescents, disks, wheels, and animal or bird heads. They are often engraved or inlayed with various designs and occasionally gilt and mounted with jewels.

Ewart Oakeshott introduced a system of classification of medieval pommel forms in his The Sword in the Age of Chivalry (1964) to stand alongside his blade typology. Oakeshott pommel types are enumerated with capital letters A–Z, with subtypes indicated by numerals.

Grip 

The grip is the handle of the sword. It is usually made of wood or metal and often covered with shagreen (untanned tough leather or shark skin). Shark skin proved to be the most durable in temperate climates but deteriorates in hot climates. Consequently, rubber became popular in the latter half of the 19th century. Whatever material covers the grip, it is usually both glued on and wrapped with wire in a helix.

Guard 

The guard is just above the grip. It is a common misconception that the cross-guard protects the wielder's entire hand from the opposing sword; only with the abandonment of the shield and then the armoured gauntlet did a full hand guard become necessary. The crossguard still protected the user from a blade that was deliberately slid down the length of the blade to cut off or injure the hand.

Early swords do not have true guards but simply a form of stop to prevent the hand slipping up the blade when thrusting as they were invariably used in conjunction with a shield.

From the 11th century, European sword guards took the form of a straight crossbar (later called "quillon") perpendicular to the blade.

Beginning in the 16th century in Europe, guards became more and more elaborate, with additional loops and curved bars or branches to protect the hand. A single curved piece alongside the fingers (roughly parallel with the handle/blade and perpendicular to any crossguards) was referred to as a knuckle-bow.

Ultimately, the bars could be supplemented or replaced with metal plates that could be ornamentally pierced. The term "basket hilt" eventually came into vogue to describe such designs, and there are a variety of basket-hilted swords.

Simultaneously, emphasis upon the thrust attack with rapiers and smallswords revealed a vulnerability to thrusting. By the 17th century, guards were developed that incorporated a solid shield that surrounded the blade out to a diameter of up to two inches or more. Older forms of this guard retained the quillons or a single quillon, but later forms eliminated the quillons, altogether being referred to as a cup-hilt. This latter form is the basis of the guards of modern foils and épées.

Ricasso 

The ricasso is a blunt section of blade just below the guard. On developed hilts it is protected by an extension of the guard.  On two-handed swords, the ricasso provided a third hand position, permitting the user's hands to be further apart for better leverage.

Sword knot 

The sword knot or sword strap, sometimes called a tassel, is a lanyard—usually of leather but sometimes of woven gold or silver bullion, or more often metallic lace—looped around the hand to prevent the sword being lost if it is dropped. Although they have a practical function, sword knots often had a decorative design. For example, the British Army generally adopted a white leather strap with a large acorn knot made out of gold wire for infantry officers at the end of the 19th century. Such acorn forms of tassels were called 'boxed', which was the way of securing the fringe of the tassel along its bottom line such that the strands could not separate and become entangled or lost. Many sword knots were also made of silk with a fine, ornamental alloy gold or silver metal wire woven into it in a specified pattern.

The military output of the artisans called  (ornamental braid, lace, cord, or trimmings makers) is evident in catalogs of various military uniform and regalia makers of centuries past.

Indian swords had the tassel attached through an eyelet at the end of the pommel.

Chinese swords, both jian and dao, often have lanyards or tassels attached. As with Western sword knots, these serve both decorative and practical functions, and the manipulation of the tassel is a part of some jian performances.

Hilt ring 

The hilt ring is an optional item used for decoration.

References

Swords
Blade weapons